The canton of Auch-3 is an administrative division of the Gers department, southwestern France. It was created at the French canton reorganisation which came into effect in March 2015. Its seat is in Auch.

It consists of the following communes:
 
Auch (partly)
Auterive
Boucagnères
Durban
Haulies
Lasseube-Propre
Orbessan
Ornézan
Pessan
Sansan

References

Cantons of Gers